Wyers Ice Shelf is a small Antarctic ice shelf on the east side of the base of Sakellari Peninsula.

References

External links
Map of the area

Ice shelves of Antarctica
Enderby Land